Chitale Bandhu Mithaiwale is an Indian snacks enterprise which popularly runs in Maharashtra. It was formed by Shri. Raghunath Bhaskar Chitale(Bhausaheb) and Narsinha Bhaskar Chitale(Rajabhau) in 1950 as a subsidiary of the Chitale Group of Industries. Its first outlet was set up in Bajirao Road, Pune (Poona) City. Although its outlets are limited to major cities of Maharashtra, the products are distributed all across India. Over the years, Chitale Bandhu has been known for making namkeen (especially bakarwadis) and sweets. It is also known to export its namkeen to countries such asU.S., Singapore, and Israel. The brand menu consists of over sixty different kinds of sweets and forty different kinds of namkeen. The enterprise has an average turnover of around 200 crore rupees with around 2,000 to 2,500 customers shopping every day.

History

Early years 
In mid-1930s, Bhaskar Ganesh Chitale, also known as B. G. Chitale, was an ordinary milk businessman located in a small village of Limb Gaon situated in the Satara district of Maharashtra. Due to an unexpected turn of events, his cattle fell prey to an unknown disease resulting in their death. This caused a major loss in the business owned by the Chitale Family. In 1939, with a fresh start B. G. Chitale founded the Chitale Group of industries by starting their first enterprise, Chitale Dairy. The brand quickly gained reputation for its quality after it expanded its reach after Raghunath Rao Chitale (Also known as Bhau Chitale; Son of B. G. Chitale) set up a shop in Mumbai, Maharashtra in a partnership.

In the year 1946, the partnership came to an end and Raghunath Rao Chitale had to leave Mumbai. He then moved to Pune and along with his brother Narsinha started vending milk supplied to him from Bhilawadi in Palus, Maharashtra. The business became a success in the city and in the year 1950 he bought a 500 square feet shop where he set up a new enterprise, Chitale Bandhu Mithaiwale. The shop is still operational and is now considered the headquarters of Chitale Bandhu.

Introduction to Bakarwadi 
Chitale Bandhu started the sale of bakarwadi in 1970. Due to the growth of demand, the enterprise then installed machines to maintain the original shape and size of the bakarwadi. In the early nineties, the bakarwadi sale was around  a day. Introduction of bakarwadi in Chitale Bandhu's shop increased the sales of the enterprise to a great extent. This growing demand for the new snack was fulfilled after Narsinha (Rajabhau) Chitale toured Japan in the 1970s. With the new innovations and technology, the enterprise adopted a semi-automatic production of bakarwadi in 1989. Later, the production was made completely automatic. This allowed the enterprise to grow faster. In the following years Chitale Bandhu started opening multiple branches around the city of Pune.

Products

Snacks and namkeen 
Chitale Bandhu Mithaiwale has over 40 varieties of Namkeen sold at multiple outlets. Some of the common and widely sold Namkeen include: bakarwadi, various Chivda, Farsan, Gathi, Papadi, various sev, and Shankarpali. Along with these there are also multiple chaat products such as Samosa and Kachori.

Bakarwadi 
Chitale Bandhu has been known for selling bakarwadi since the early 1970s. Although this snack was originally made in Gujarat, it gained popularity in Maharashtra when it was introduced (Many believe that this is due to its spice which is common in Maharashtra). “In 1970, a person from Surat, Gujarat introduced Bhausaheb to the bakarwadi,” said Indraneel Chitale, one of Bhausaheb’s grandsons. Technically, the Chitales didn’t invent the crunchy besan- and maida-based snack. It has been a part of traditional west Indian cooking, particularly Gujarati farsaan, for a long time. But without Bhausaheb Chitale and the rapid growth of India’s packaged food industry, bakarwadi may not have been as popular among Indians both in the country and abroad. Many sources, such as NDTV foods, believe that although the enterprise was performing well in the sweets sector, after the introduction of bakarwadi in the menu, its sales increased rapidly. NDTV foods also referred to this snack as a "bronzed snack". With the technological change, the organisation made the production of bakarwadi automatic, which allowed it to boost the production of bakarwadi. This increased the sale of bakarwadis from 300 kilos a day in 1970, to over 3000 kilos a day in 2012.

Sev 
A large variety of sev is available at Chitale Bandhu, such as:

 Tikhat Jad (spicy and thick) Sev 
 Sadhi (Normal-sized) Sev
 Zero-sized Sev
 Masala Sev
 Palak (Spinach) Sev
 Tomato Sev

Chivda 
The enterprise has also been known for selling variety of chivda, such as:

 Poha (Flattened rice) Chivda
 Maka (Corn) Chivda
 Potato Chivda
 Namkeen Mix

Sweets 
There are over 60 different sweets on the menu of the enterprise. The sweets that are sold include: various types of halva (such as almond and pineapple flavour), burfi, sweet rolls, peda, Laddu and Jalebi (also pronounced as "Jilebi" ).

Burfi 
A list of burfi which are sold at Chitale Bandhu include:

 Kaju Katali
 Anjir (Fig) Burfi
 Pista Burfi
 Malai Burfi

Rolls (sweet) 
The enterprise has various flavours of roll which include: gulkand, mango, anjir, and cashew-apple.

Franchising & Distribution 
Chitale Bandhu Mithaiwale currently has over 45 franchises across the state of Maharashtra and an intricate network of distributors within the state as well as outside making sure the products are available everywhere.

Exports 
The company currently exports its range of products to countries across the European Union, USA, South East Asia, Middle East Gulf Countries and Australia.

Chitale Bandhu Mithaiwale have now appointed exclusive distributors and super stockists in big export markets such as Australia, Europe, Scandinavia, and are expanding in other markets too.

Controversy 

In 2017, the workers of Chitale Bandhu Mithaiwale, went on a strike who demanded a hike in their salaries. Following the labor court's order, the workers returned to work on 1 October 2017. However, according to the workers, they were not given a professional treatment after re-joining. Many of them stated that they were made to sit idle in the working hours. One of the employee, Vandana Ughade, claimed that the doors of the workplace were also closed to confine the workers in. Indraneel Chitale, the owner of the enterprise in 2017, countered all the claims by stating that the workers were left idle because the production itself was low due to the preceding strike.

References 

Snack food manufacturers
Confectionery companies of India
Companies based in Pune
Indian brands
Indian companies established in 1950
Food and drink companies established in 1950